Dunhuang Dance is a form of Chinese dance which combines traditional culture and modern art. Dunhuang dance draws inspiration from the body movements in the Dunhuang grotto frescoes (such as in the Mogao caves), and the musical instruments and music scores found in Dunhuang, Gansu province, West China. The dance shows the combination of ethnic dance styles from Central and Western China. The dances itself is also influenced by Buddhist images and Buddhism.

Sources of inspiration 
The Mogao grottoes in Dunhuang houses several form of fine arts such as dance and music. It is filled with many dance images which inspired modern dance artists in China. Images of flying apsaras (Feitian) from the grottoes are also source of inspiration.

List of Dunhuang dances

Thousand Hand Guan Yin 
It is a contemporary creation produced by the Chinese choreographer Zhang Jigang. It was performed by the China Disabled Performing Art Troupe in which the group dancers are hearing-impaired.

Other depictions in media 

 Rain of Flowers on the Silk Road, a dance drama presented in Beijing on May 23, 1979 by the Gansu Dunhuang Art Academy of China.

Gallery

See also 

 Dance in China
 List of dance in China

References

Dances of China
Chinese folk music